The 1992 Estoril Open was a men's tennis tournament played on outdoor clay courts. This event was the 3rd edition of the Estoril Open, included in the 1992 ATP Tour World Series. The event took place at the Estoril Court Central, in Oeiras, Portugal, from 30 March through 6 April 1992. Carlos Costa won the singles title.

Finals

Singles

 Carlos Costa defeated  Sergi Bruguera 4–6, 6–2, 6–2
It was Costa's 1st singles title of his career.

Doubles

 Hendrik Jan Davids /  Libor Pimek defeated  Luke Jensen /  Laurie Warder 3–6, 6–3, 7–5
It was Davids' 1st title of the year and 3rd of his career. It was Pimek's 1st title of the year and 7th of his career.

References

External links
 Official website
 ITF tournament edition details

1992
Estoril
Estoril Open
Estoril Open
 Estoril Open